Reticunassa is a genus of sea snails, marine gastropod mollusks in the family Nassariidae, the Nassa mud snails or dog whelks.

Species
 Reticunassa annabolteae Galindo, Kool & Dekker, 2017
 Reticunassa cockburnensis (Kool & Dekker, 2006)
 Reticunassa compacta (Angas, 1865)
 Reticunassa crenulicostata (Shuto, 1969)
 Reticunassa dermestina (Gould, 1860)
 Reticunassa erythraea (Issel, 1869)
 Reticunassa festiva (Powys, 1835)
 Reticunassa goliath Galindo, Kool & Dekker, 2017
 Reticunassa hanraveni (Kool & Dekker, 2006)
 Reticunassa intrudens Galindo, Kool & Dekker, 2017
 Reticunassa jeanmartini (Kool & Dekker, 2006)
 Reticunassa luteola (E. A. Smith, 1879)
 Reticunassa microstoma (Pease, 1860)
 Reticunassa myanmarensis Kool, 2021
 Reticunassa neoproducta (Kool & Dekker, 2007)
 Reticunassa paupera (Gould, 1850)
 Reticunassa pilata (Hedley, 1915)
 Reticunassa plebecula (Gould, 1860)
 Reticunassa poppeorum Galindo, Kool & Dekker, 2017
 Reticunassa rotunda (Melvill & Standen, 1896)
 Reticunassa silvardi (Kool & Dekker, 2006)
 Reticunassa simoni (Kool & Dekker, 2007)
 Reticunassa taggartorum (Kuroda, 1960)
 Reticunassa tanager Kool, 2021
 Reticunassa thailandensis Galindo, Kool & Dekker, 2017
 Reticunassa tringa (Souverbie, 1864)
 Reticunassa visayaensis Galindo, Kool & Dekker, 2017
 Reticunassa zanzibarensis (Kool & Dekker, 2007)
Taxon inquirendum
 Reticunassa balteata (Pease, 1869) 
Species brought into synonymy
 Reticunassa acutidentata (E. A. Smith, 1879): synonym of Nassarius multigranosus (Dunker, 1847)
 Reticunassa chibi Habe, 1960: synonym of Nassarius chibi (Habe, 1960) (original combination)
 Reticunassa dipsacoides (Hedley, 1907): synonym of Nassarius ephamillus (R. B. Watson, 1882): synonym of Tritia ephamilla (R. B. Watson, 1882)
 Reticunassa flindersi Cotton & Godfrey, 1938: synonym of Nassarius ephamillus (R. B. Watson, 1882): synonym of Tritia ephamilla (R. B. Watson, 1882)
 Reticunassa fratercula (Dunker, 1860): synonym of Nassarius fraterculus (Dunker, 1860)
 Reticunassa fraterculus (Dunker, 1860): synonym of Nassarius fraterculus (Dunker, 1860)
 Reticunassa fuscolineata (E. A. Smith, 1875): synonym of Nassarius fuscolineatus (E. A. Smith, 1875)
 † Reticunassa hongoensis (Itoigawa, 1955): synonym of † Nassarius hongoensis Itoigawa, 1955 
 Reticunassa japonica (A. Adams, 1852): synonym of Nassarius japonicus (A. Adams, 1852)
 Reticunassa mobilis (Hedley & May, 1908): synonym of Nassarius mobilis (Hedley & May, 1908)
 Reticunassa praematurata Kuroda & Habe in Habe, 1960: synonym of Nassarius praematuratus (Kuroda & Habe in Habe, 1960)
 † Reticunassa simizui (Otuka, 1934): synonym of † Nassarius simizui Otuka, 1934 
 Reticunassa spurca (Gould, 1860): synonym of Nassarius multigranosus (Dunker, 1847)
 † Reticunassa subcopiosa (Ludbrook, 1958): synonym of † Nassarius subcopiosus (Ludbrook, 1958) 
 † Reticunassa tatei (Tenison Woods, 1879): synonym of † Nassarius tatei (Tenison Woods, 1879) 
 Reticunassa verconis (Cotton & Godfrey, 1932): synonym of Nassarius mobilis (Hedley & May, 1908)

References

External links
 Iredale, T. (1936). Australian molluscan notes, no. 2. Records of the Australian Museum. 19(5): 267-340, pls 20-24
 Galindo L.A., Kool H.H. & Dekker H. (2017). Review of the Nassarius pauperus (Gould, 1850) complex (Nassariidae): Part 3, reinstatement of the genus Reticunassa, with the description of six new species. European Journal of Taxonomy. 275: 1-43
 Galindo, L. A.; Puillandre, N.; Utge, J.; Lozouet, P.; Bouchet, P. (2016). The phylogeny and systematics of the Nassariidae revisited (Gastropoda, Buccinoidea). Molecular Phylogenetics and Evolution. 99: 337-353

 
Nassariidae
Gastropod genera